Kerry Blackshear Jr. (born January 28, 1997) is an American professional basketball player for Hiroshima Dragonflies of the B.League. He played college basketball for the Virginia Tech Hokies and the Florida Gators.

Early life and high school career
Blackshear's father, Kerry Blackshear Sr., played in college at Stetson, where he was the second-leading scorer in program history and the 1994–95 Atlantic Sun Player of the Year before embarking on a professional career. His mother, Lamilia Ford Blackshear, is the third-leading rebounder for the Stetson women. By the time the younger Blackshear reached high school at Maynard Evans in Orlando, Florida, he had been raised around the world and his game resembled a European big man. Blackshear was regarded as a four-star prospect in the 2015 class, ranked by 247Sports as the 25th ranked power forward and 88th overall player.

College career

Virginia Tech
As a freshman at Virginia Tech, Blackshear posted 6.2 points per game off the bench. He was forced to redshirt his sophomore season due to a foot injury. Blackshear averaged 12.5 points and 5.9 rebounds per game as a redshirt sophomore for Virginia Tech. 

After roommate Justin Robinson went down with a foot injury on January 30, 2019, Blackshear picked up his production, scoring 29 points and grabbing nine rebounds in a win at Pittsburgh. As a junior, Blackshear averaged 14.9 points, 7.5 rebounds and 2.4 assists per game, shooting 50.8% from the field and 33.3% from behind the arc. He was named to the Second Team All-ACC. Blackshear helped lead Virginia Tech to the Sweet 16 of the NCAA Tournament, contributing 18 points, 16 rebounds, five assists and two blocks in a narrow defeat to Duke. After the season he declared for the 2019 NBA draft. Blackshear withdrew from the draft shortly before the deadline but announced he was transferring from Virginia Tech. On June 26, 2019, he announced he would play at Florida in his final season of eligibility.

Florida

In his first game in a Florida uniform, Blackshear had 20 points and 10 rebounds as the Gators defeated North Florida 74–59. On January 4, 2020, Blackshear scored 24 points and had 16 rebounds in a 104–98 win over Alabama in double overtime, during which Florida overcame a 21 point deficit, the largest comeback in school history. Blackshear sprained his left wrist during the season finale versus Kentucky. He averaged 12.8 points and 7.5 rebounds per game at Florida. At the conclusion of the regular season, Blackshear was named to the Second Team All-SEC.

Professional career

Hapoel Gilboa Galil
On August 9, 2020, Blackshear signed with Hapoel Gilboa Galil of the Israeli Premier League.

Galatasaray Nef
On August 24, 2021, he signed a one year deal with Galatasaray Nef of the Turkish Basketbol Süper Ligi (BSL), with the option of an additional season.

Hiroshima Dragonflies
On July 12, 2022, he has signed with Hiroshima Dragonflies of the B.League.

Career statistics

College

|-
| style="text-align:left;"| 2015–16
| style="text-align:left;"| Virginia Tech
| 35 || 5 || 19.2 || .553 || .235 || .558 || 4.5 || .6 || .5 || .4 || 6.2
|-
| style="text-align:left;"| 2016–17
| style="text-align:left;"| Virginia Tech
| style="text-align:center;" colspan="11"|  Redshirt
|-
| style="text-align:left;"| 2017–18
| style="text-align:left;"| Virginia Tech
| 33 || 32 || 25.2 || .558 || .306 || .747 || 5.9 || 1.2 || .8 || .9 || 12.5
|-
| style="text-align:left;"| 2018–19
| style="text-align:left;"| Virginia Tech
| 35 || 35 || 30.0 || .508 || .333 || .736 || 7.5 || 2.4 || .7 || .8 || 14.9
|-
| style="text-align:left;"| 2019–20
| style="text-align:left;"| Florida
| 31 || 31 || 27.2 || .436 || .305 || .792 || 7.5 || 1.6 || .6 || .6 || 12.8
|- class="sortbottom"
| style="text-align:center;" colspan="2"| Career
| 134 || 103 || 25.3 || .509 || .308 || .731 || 6.3 || 1.4 || .6 || .7 || 11.6

References

External links
Florida Gators bio
Virginia Tech Hokies bio

1997 births
Living people
American expatriate basketball people in Israel
American men's basketball players
Basketball players from Orlando, Florida
Florida Gators men's basketball players
Galatasaray S.K. (men's basketball) players
Hapoel Gilboa Galil Elyon players
Israeli Basketball Premier League players
Power forwards (basketball)
Virginia Tech Hokies men's basketball players